Sinelnikov, Synelnykov (Russian or Ukrainian: Синельников, from Синельник meaning a blue-color dyer) or Siņeļņikovs (Latvian spelling) is a Russian masculine surname, its feminine counterpart is Sinelnikova. Notable people with the surname include:

Alans Siņeļņikovs (born 1990), Latvian football player
Cyril Sinelnikov (1901–1966), was a Russian nuclear physicist
Nikolai Sinelnikov (1855—1939), Russian stage actor
Yevgen Synelnykov (born 1981), Ukrainian TV presenter and actor
Denis Sinelnikov (born 1979), Digital Marketing Pioneer and entrepreneur

References

Russian-language surnames